Jersey Bulls Football Club is a football club located in Saint Helier, Jersey, Channel Islands.

History 

The Jersey Football Combination, operated by the Jersey Football Association, has been the top level of football in the island of Jersey since 1975 and operates with 13 teams in two leagues, Premiership and Championship. Although affiliated with The Football Association, the league does not form part of the English football league system with teams unable to progress from the Jersey Football Combination or enter any cups, unless invited. The league leaders from Jersey would play the league leaders from the Guernsey Priaulx League in the Upton Park Trophy.

In 2015 the Jersey Football Association applied to UEFA and FIFA to allow them to play other teams, in a similar arrangement to Gibraltar. This was rejected on the basis Jersey was not an independent country. A Parishes of Jersey football team was formed and applied and accepted to ConIFA to play international matches with other teams not able to join UEFA and FIFA.

Jersey Bulls Football Club was formed on 7 August 2018, and in September it was announced that the club would apply to join the English football league system, via The Football Association. In November 2018, The Football Association approved the club's bid to join Division One of the Combined Counties League for the 2019–20 season.

Former Muratti Vase winner Gary Freeman was appointed as the club's first manager in January 2019. Freeman was manager at St Peter from February 2015 and took on the Jersey Bulls role from the end of the 2018–19 season.

The first eight fixtures of the league were announced by the Combined Counties Football League on 5 June to allow clubs preparation in booking transport to or from Jersey, with Ash United being the first team to visit Jersey and Deportivo Galicia being the first away fixture.

Jersey Bulls announced on 13 June 2019 that they had signed 30 players at the beginning of the season with all players dual registered with their current clubs in Jersey.

Abandoned 2019–20 season 
The 2019–20 season started with two friendly games, the first with League Two side Stevenage on 6 July which was won by Stevenage 3–4, followed by Leicester City Under-23's on 16 July won by Leicester 3–0.

Their 2019–20 league campaign in the Combined Counties League Division One began with a 3–0 win over Ash United. By 16 November they had 15 straight victories in all competitions. Their 16th victory came on 23 November in a 7–0 victory, and after their 19th victory on 16 December they were 24 points clear at the top of the table. They ended 2019 with their 20th straight victory, despite their flight being delayed by two hours and the coach being delayed in traffic and running onto the pitch straight from the coach, they beat Farnham Town 2–0 and began 2020 with another victory, their 21st straight win.

On 7 March 2020, Forward Lorne Bickley signed a short-term contract with National League side Hartlepool United. The next day Jersey Bulls set a new record in the Combined Counties League on 27 consecutive wins, beating Withdean 2000's record which was set during the 2002–03 season. With 81 points on the table, they were statistically eligible for promotion to step 5 football. A few days later, most sporting leagues in the United Kingdom were halted due to the COVID-19 pandemic. It was later confirmed that the Combined Counties League had been abandoned with all results null and voided. On 30 March 2020, Jersey Bulls were one of sixty-six non-league clubs who sent an open letter to the Football Association requesting that they reconsider their decision. The request within this letter was denied and Jersey Bulls would return to Division One for the 2020/21 season.

2020–21 season 
On 5 September, Jersey Bulls began their second season in Division One away to Bedford & Feltham with a 1–4 victory. The Bulls would subsequently defeat British Airways 0–2, Fleet Spurs 0-1 and Ash United 2–3, all away from home. Jersey Bulls are again unbeaten in Division One as of 1 January 2021, extending their unbeaten run to 31 games under inaugural manager Gary Freeman. In March the Football Association announced that the 2020–21 season at Step 3 to step 7 would be curtailed, prematurely ending Jersey Bulls' second season in Division One again. However, the FA later confirmed that the planned restructuring of the National League System would take place as planned, with teams allowed to apply for promotion.

Colours and badge 

In September 2018, the club announced their logo and kit, stating: "Our logo and proposed home kit, reflects our proud Jersey roots and the island's dairy heritage. Jersey may be most famous for its cows, but they'd be nowhere without the bulls. The bull is animated to show our passion for football, passion for Jersey and its community, and our desire to make this football club succeed. The kit and logo is red and white, obvious Jersey colours, and also includes a nod to the Jersey flag."
The home kit is a white shirt with a red cross, resembling the Flag of Jersey, with red shorts and socks, whilst the away kit is a red shirt with white shorts and socks. In April 2020, The Bulls launched a competition to choose the third kit and the winning designed was announced on 1 May 2020 on their social media as a dark blue shirt with pink trim, based on the colours of their second biggest sponsor, Butterfield Bank.

Kit suppliers and shirt sponsors

Stadium 

The club play at Springfield Stadium in St. Helier. Although situated in St. Helier, the stadium is about one mile from the town centre.

First used by the Royal Jersey Agricultural and Horticultural Society (RJA&HS) as a showground in 1885 for agricultural shows and was first used for the Muratti Vase in 1905 and has been held regularly since the 1930s, with a few exceptions.  The RJA&HS proposed a sale in 1993 for housing development but was bought by the Sport, Leisure and Recreation Committee of the States Assembly stepped in the preserve it for sports and brought the site in December 1994.

The capacity of the stadium holds up to 7,000 spectators and the grandstand, built in 1997, has seating for 992.

The stadium and the multi-purpose sports facility attached to it is owned by the Government of Jersey, and is also home to the Jersey Football Association and the Jersey official football team. A children's play area and an all-weather ball court was also built within the park.

Players 
The club currently operates a squad rotation policy, allowing the players to represent their respective Jersey FA league clubs when called upon. Channel Islander-born players are eligible to play for any of the Home Nations.

Current squad

Club officials 
Source:

Boardroom staff

First-team coaching staff

Management history 
Stats as of 5 December 2021, league games only

Records

League 
League consecutive winning games: 27 games Combined Counties Football League Division One, 2019–20 season

Goals 
Record league win: 8–0 Sheerwater, 12 February 2022
Record win: 10–1 Horsham YMCA, 7 August 2021 
Worst league defeat: 1–3 Balham FC , 30 March 2022 
Most goals in a game: 11 Goals: 10–1 Horsham YMCA 7 August 2021

Attendance 
Highest attendance: 1611 – Chertsey Town 3 October 2021
Lowest attendance: 545 – Fleet Spurs, 11 January 2020 
Seasons average highest attendance:

Player 
Highest individual scorer in a competitive match: 3 goals; Karl Hinds against FC Deportivo Galicia 14 August 2019, Sol Solomon against Chessington & Hook United 1 February 2020, Lorne Bickley against  Horsham YMCA F.C. 7 August 2021, Sol Solomon against Horsham YMCA F.C. 7 August 2021, Sol Solomon against Crowborough Athletic F.C. 26 September 2021

Most league goals in a season: 19, Karl Hinds (as of 28 February 2020)
All-Time Leading Goalscorers:

See also 
 Jersey official football team

References

External links 

Football clubs in England
Football clubs in Jersey
Association football clubs established in 2018
2018 establishments in Jersey
Combined Counties Football League
Expatriated football clubs